Henry Allen Ripley (March 4, 1842 – October 25, 1926) was an American businessman and politician.

Born in Sand Lake, New York, Ripley moved with his parents and settled in Oakfield, Wisconsin Territory in 1844. Ripley went to Fond du Lac High School. He was a farmer and also taught school. Ripley was in the lumber and coal business in Oakfield, Wisconsin. Ripley served on the village high school board. In 1899, Ripley served in the Wisconsin State Assembly and was a Republican. Ripley died at his home in Oakfield, Wisconsin.

Notes

1842 births
1926 deaths
People from Oakfield, Wisconsin
People from Sand Lake, New York
Businesspeople from Wisconsin
Educators from Wisconsin
Farmers from Wisconsin
School board members in Wisconsin
Educators from New York (state)
Republican Party members of the Wisconsin State Assembly